Joseph Edward Gage (c.1687 – 1766) was an entrepreneur and speculator. He was the son of Joseph Gage of Sherborne Castle and Elizabeth Penruddock and the brother of Thomas Gage, 1st Viscount Gage Bt

As a young man in Paris, he borrowed money from Richard Cantillon to speculate in shares in Mississippi Company and the South Sea Company. He made a vast paper fortune, whereupon he offered Augustus II the Strong the King of Poland 3,000,000 pounds for his crown. When this offer was declined, he made a similar offer for the crown of Sardinia. Later, he was granted a silver mine, and entered into the service of the King of Spain, given the command of his armies in Sicily and Lombardy, and created a grandee (March 1743) of the first class of the kingdom of Spain. He was also presented by the King of Naples with the order of San Gennaro, and a pension of 4000 ducats a year.

He married Lady Mary Herbert, who was also involved in Gage's financial speculations. She was twice bailed out by her father, William Herbert, 1st Marquess of Powis, after incurring substantial losses.

References
 Richard Cantillon: Entrepreneur and Economist by Antoin E. Murphy

See also
Viscount Gage

English businesspeople
1687 births
1766 deaths